"All That Jazz" is a song from the 1975 musical Chicago. It has music by John Kander and lyrics by Fred Ebb, and is the opening song of the musical. The title of the 1979 film, starring Roy Scheider as a character strongly resembling choreographer/stage and film director Bob Fosse, is derived from the song.

Composition
Opus, Book 3 by Rob Blythe notes the song uses the 7th chord to create a unique musical effect.

Analysis
Popular Culture: Introductory Perspectives postulated that the song encapsulated the "importance of jazz in the constitution of pop culture". Describes it as a "cynical comment on the willingness of humans...to act solely, simply, and remorselessly in their own interest", and deeming this unlawful conduct as part of "all that jazz" one needs to get by. BlueCoupe said in the song, "the ghost of Bob Fosse hangs about".

Versions

In Chicago
Chita Rivera performs it on the original cast album of Chicago (1975).
Bebe Neuwirth performs it on the Broadway revival cast album of Chicago (1996)
The version performed by Catherine Zeta-Jones and cast in the film version of Chicago (2002) was listed as #98 on AFI's 100 Years...100 Songs list.

Other uses
Liza Minnelli recorded a single version (1975).  She has also performed it in concert.
The JabbaWockeeZ danced to this song on America's Best Dance Crew in 2008.
Niki Evans sang the song on the fourth edition of The X Factor.
The Bellagio Fountains attraction at the Bellagio hotel in Las Vegas has this song on their playlist.
Shirley Bassey, in her 1998 concert Viva Diva! for the BBC.
In 2010, on Over the Rainbow, Andrew Lloyd Webber's show to search for a West End Dorothy Gale in The Wizard of Oz, four girls in a group in the Top 20 had to sing "All That Jazz" to convince Andrew and the judges that they were potential Dorothys. Three of them made it through - Stephanie Davis (who ended up in seventh place), Jessica Robinson (who ended up in fifth place), and Sophie Evans, who made the final and came runner-up. Ruthie Henshall, who had played both Velma and Roxie in the West End's Chicago, coached the girls.
The song was covered by Kate Hudson and Lea Michele on the Glee Season 4 Episode 9 "Swan Song" where they competed to see who is better.
Camila Mendes, Madelaine Petsch, and Vanessa Morgan covered this song in the Riverdale Season 4 episode "Fast Times at Riverdale High".
In the American Dad! episode "Hamerican Dad", a variation of the song titled "All That Ham" (which is largely the same outside of the title lyric) was performed by the character of Roger in one of his numerous disguises.

References

Songs about jazz
1975 songs
Liza Minnelli songs
Shirley Bassey songs
Songs from musicals
Songs with lyrics by Fred Ebb
Songs with music by John Kander